CVQO is a UK education charity offering a broad range of vocational qualifications, designed to recognise the work undertaken by young people and adult volunteers within youth organisations.

Charity summary 
Young people and adult volunteers who are members of youth and cadet groups in the UK learn a wide variety of skills that are often transferable to higher education and the workplace.

CVQO offers qualifications that recognise these skills and provide tangible evidence of a learner's achievements. These skills include: leadership, team building, problem solving, communication, health and physical fitness, music, sport, social action, volunteering and community support.

The charity works with a wide variety of educational establishments such as Pearson BTEC, City & Guilds and The Institute of Leadership and Management.

Partnership organisations 
 Sea Cadet Corps (SCC)
 Army Cadet Force (ACF)
 Air Training Corps (ATC)
 Combined Cadet Force (CCF)
 Volunteer Cadet Corps
 Royal Marines Band Service
 Royal Corps of Army Music (CAMUS)
 Army School of Ceremonial Drumming Wing
 St John Ambulance
 Police Cadets 
 Fire Cadets
 The Prince's Trust
 Boys' Brigade

Qualifications

For 13-18 year olds 
CVQO offers a broad range of vocational qualifications that are designed to recognise the work undertaken by young people within youth organisations.

Young people aged 13–18 and a member of a UK youth or community group can enroll with the charity to study for a CV and future-boosting vocational qualification.

Currently offered:
 BTEC Level 1 in Teamwork and Personal Skills in the Community
 BTEC Level 1 in Teamwork and Personal Skills for Uniformed Youth Organisations
 BTEC Level 2 in Teamwork and Personal Development in the Community
 BTEC Level 2 in Music for Practical Performance
 ILM Level 2 Award in Leadership and Team Skills
 ILM Level 2 Award for Young Leaders
 ILM Level 2 Award in Effective Team Member Skills
 ILM Level 3 Award in Leadership and Management

Formerly offered:
 BTEC Level 2 in Public Services
 BTEC Level 2 in Aviation Studies (Royal Air Force Air Cadets only)
 BTEC Level 2 in Engineering (Sea Cadet Corps only)
 BTEC Level 3 in Public Services 
 BTEC Level 3 in Music
 BTEC Level 3 in Sport

For adults 
Adult members of staff, and Staff Cadets of the Air Training Corps, can also receive the following qualifications from CVQO:
 BTEC Level 3 in Education and Training 
 BTEC Level 3 in Music (Performance)
 ILM Level 3 Award in Leadership and Management
 ILM Level 4 Award in Leadership and Management
 ILM Level 5 Award in Leadership and Management
 ILM Level 5 Certificate in Leadership and Management
 City & Guilds Licentiateship (in Leadership & Management) (Level 4 Award)
 City & Guilds Afiliateship (in Leadership & Management) (Level 5 Award)
 City & Guilds Graduateship (in Leadership & Management) (Level 6 Award)
 City & Guilds Membership (in Leadership & Management) (Level 7 Award)

The CVQO Westminster Award 
The CVQO Westminster Award is CVQO's annual search for the pick of its BTEC learners from across the UK. It runs from November to July, with the ultimate prize being a two-week trip to South Africa for the finalists - as well as lunch at the House of Lords in June and a selection event in Somerset in April.

The Award is intended to recognise the achievements of young people who are determined, always keeping their heads up and remaining positive through adversity; those who have overcome a personal challenge or gone the distance to help someone.

External links 
 CVQO

References 

Educational qualifications in the United Kingdom
British Cadet organisations
Youth organisations based in the United Kingdom